Sye Raa Narasimha Reddy is a 2019 Indian Telugu-language historical action film directed by Surender Reddy and produced by Ram Charan under the Konidela Production Company banner. Surender Reddy scripted the film based on an original story given by Paruchuri brothers. A work of fiction, the film is inspired by the life of Indian independence activist Uyyalawada Narasimha Reddy from the Rayalaseema region of Andhra Pradesh. The film stars Chiranjeevi as the title character with Nayanthara, Tamannaah, Sudeep, Jagapathi Babu, and Vijay Sethupathi (in his Telugu film debut) in supporting roles. Amitabh Bachchan and Anushka Shetty make guest appearances, marking the former's Telugu debut. Pawan Kalyan, Kamal Haasan, and Mohanlal gave narration in the film. The film tells the story of Narasimha Reddy in his fight against the rule of the British East India Company. 

It was officially launched on 22 August 2017, coinciding with Chiranjeevi's birthday, whereas principal photography of the film began on 6 December 2017 and wrapped up within 24 June 2019. The film was shot across Hyderabad, Kerala while some scenes were filmed in Georgia.

The film's cinematography was handled by R. Rathnavelu, and editing done by A. Sreekar Prasad. The film features soundtrack composed by Amit Trivedi, whilst the background score was composed by Julius Packiam. Sye Raa Narasimha Reddy was released theatrically worldwide on 2 October 2019, with simultaneous dubbed versions released in Hindi, Kannada, Malayalam, and Tamil. The film received mostly positive reviews from critics, and the original Telugu version was successful in Andhra Pradesh and Telangana. But the dubbed versions in other languages were not commercially successful.

Plot 
During 1857, the Indian subcontinent is in the grips of a widespread revolt against the rule of the British East India Company. The city of Jhansi is under siege by the British, and the defending soldiers begin to waver upon seeing that they are outnumbered. However, their queen, Rani Lakshmi Bai, motivates them by telling the tale of the rebel who started their war ten years ago: Narasimha Reddy.

Reddy was born to the chief of Uyyalawada and his two wives who are the daughters of Nossam's chief. He defied death after being born still and coming to life, and is believed to be blessed by God with gifted abilities and has demonstrated athletic and acrobatic skills from a young age. One day, a teenage Reddy rides past an execution conducted by the British, and his grandfather explains the predicament faced by villagers under the rule of the East India Company. Reddy vows to retaliate and learns combat and philosophy under sage Gosayi Venkanna. 25 years later, Reddy gathers several fallen chiefs and kings from different provinces and organizes a fully operational resistance in the city of Renadu. The kingdoms were taken over by British forces led by Cochrane, the governor of Madras. Cochrane is told of Reddy's resistance being effective against their rule and sends a general named Jackson to forcefully collect Renadu's taxes.

Reddy meets the dancer Lakshmi and saves her life from stampeding cattle, who have been drugged by fellow chief Avuku Raju, who is known to have hostility towards Reddy for his popularity. Reddy rounds up the cattle, forgives Avuku, and also displays feelings for Lakshmi. But this comes to nothing as a child marriage has already been conducted between Reddy and a girl named Siddhamma, who has had feelings for Reddy even then. Due to believed omens, they were separated and reunited for a yagam ritual. Upon knowing this, Lakshmi attempts suicide, but Reddy convinces her to give life another chance. In the meantime, Jackson raids and pillages the surrounding regions of Rennadu, and challenges Reddy by killing villagers who speak against him. In retaliation, Reddy attacks Jackson's home by himself and kills all of his soldiers. He eventually beheads him and sends his head to Cochrane.

The resistance grows stronger when Lakshmi travels across the nation and promotes it, leading Tamil chief Raja Pandi to join. Cochrane sends a battalion of hundreds of men led by his man Daniel, all of whom are killed when Reddy and a group of civilians hold themselves down in a fort, using strategic traps to counter their technology. Avuku reforms and helps Reddy defeat them, admiring his bravery. In the process, Siddhama gives birth to their child in the fort, and Reddy names him Subbaya after his farmer friend who perishes. As Reddy expands his army by training civilians, Cochrane manages to capture Lakshmi and use her to get to Reddy. When Lakshmi is told that Cochrane has enough ammunition and weapons to demolish the resistance, she lights her clothes on fire and causes an explosion, killing herself and the men. Cochrane however survives and gathers his remaining troops to make a final stand against Reddy's army. The two armies clash, and Cochrane kills Obanna and Raja Pandi is gravely injured however Reddy saves him by defeating Cochrane in a sword duel. The rebels hold them back and kill 10,000 men, but Reddy is forced to go into hiding when an injured Cochrane continues to search for him.

A chief named Veera Reddy betrays the resistance out of anger since Reddy had killed his son for attempting to assassinate him and collect a British bounty on his head. At the same time, Reddy gave his treacherous brother a second chance but only to reveal his allies. It turns out that Reddy had spared and forgave him, without knowing Veera drugs Reddy's tea which weakens him, allowing Cochrane's men to capture him. Reddy is convicted and his supporters are exiled, but before Reddy is executed he gives a speech to his people telling them to stand strong and hold up the resistance. However, Reddy does not die even from hanging and escapes the noose. One of the soldiers beheads him, but even afterward, Reddy's body manages to stab Cochrane dead. Reddy's head is hung for a display to suppress the rebellion. Gosayi Venkanna, Avuku Raju, Raja Pandi, and other supporters of Reddy are exiled from India. 10 years later, Rani Lakshmi Bai and her men fight the British and defeat them. A narration states that Reddy's rebellions will have served as inspiration for warriors and activists to gain their deserved freedom.

Cast 

 Chiranjeevi as Narasimha Reddy, the leader of India's resistance and a supremely skilled warrior.
 Rudra Soni as young Narasimha
 Nayanthara as Siddhamma, Narasimha Reddy's wife, married to him as a child. 
 Tamannaah as Lakshmi, Narasimha Reddy's estranged lover, and orphaned dancer who dedicates her art to God. 
 Sudeep as Avuku Raju, a chief who is envious of Reddy's popularity but still admires his courage.
 Jagapathi Babu as Veera Reddy, Narasimha Reddy's brother whose son betrays the resistance. Believing Narasimha Reddy executed him while displaying partiality to his traitorous brother, he drugs Reddy, leading to his capture. 
 Vijay Sethupathi as Raja Pandi, a Tamil warrior who joins the resistance
 Ravi Kishan as Basi Reddy, Reddy's half brother, who betrays the resistance for money.
 Brahmaji as Vadde Obanna, Reddy's deputy. 
 Mukesh Rishi as Papa Khan, an Islamic chief and member of the resistance.
 Alexx O'Nell as Watson
 Lakshmi Gopalaswamy as Seethamma, Narasimha Reddy's mother
 Rohini as Padmamma
 Niharika Konidela as Bhagyam
 Anand as Kumara Mallareddy, Narasimha Reddy's elder brother
 Pavitra Lokesh as Neelamma
 Henry Maynard as Cochrane, the Governor of Madras Presidency and main antagonist. He commanded the attacks against the rebellion. 
 Oscar Skagerberg as Jackson, the general who challenges Reddy by killing Renadu's villagers. 
 Matthew Stirling as Daniel, the leader of the battalion that Cochrane sends against Reddy. 
 James Graeme as Lord Macaulay
 Mark Kitto as Inglis, Court Judge
 Raghu Babu as Raghavachari, the tax officer appointed by Cochrane and Jackson.
 Prudhvi Raj as Madhavayyar, a worker of Cochrane.
 Tanikella Bharani as Swamiji Govindayya Sharma
 Sai Chand as Subbaya, a kind elderly farmer who is threatened by Jackson.
 Santhosh Adduri as Varada Reddy
 Ranadhir Reddy as Narsi Reddy
 Raghu Karumanchi as Bulli Reddy
 Charandeep
 Rudra Soni as Young Narasimha Reddy
 Nassar as Narasimha Reddy's grandfather (cameo appearance)
 Amitabh Bachchan as Guru Gosayi Venkanna (cameo appearance), Reddy's teacher in combat and philosophy.
 Anushka Shetty as Rani Lakshmi Bai (cameo appearance), the queen of Jhansi city who leads the Sepoy Mutiny

Production

Development 
Following the phenomenal success of the Chiranjeevi-starrer Khaidi No. 150 (2017), Ram Charan who made his production debut, through this film, announced that he will collaborate with his father Chiranjeevi for the second time. Touted to be mostly based on the life of Indian independence activist Uyyalawada Narasimha Reddy from the Rayalaseema region of Andhra Pradesh, the script was written by Paruchuri Brothers, and was rumoured to cast Bollywood actress Aishwarya Rai Bachchan, opposite Chiranjeevi, although her dates had not been finalised. Amitabh Bachchan and Ravi Kishan were reported to sign in pivotal roles. In June 2017, a still featuring Chiranjeevi in a tweaked moustache went viral, with many fans supposed to mention about his look for the film.

Casting 
Soon after the launch of the film, Vijay Sethupathi and Amitabh Bachchan was hired to play a crucial role in the film, marking their debuts in the Telugu film industry. Kiccha Sudeep, Jagapathi Babu and Nayanthara were hired to play pivotal characters. Bachchan was essayed to play a short role of Chiranjeevi's mentor in the film, while Vijay Sethupathi's role was reported to be a close aide of the protagonist. Tamannaah was hired to play the second female lead in April 2018. Chiranjeevi's niece Niharika Konidela, was hired for a crucial sequence in September 2018. In May 2019, Anushka Shetty was confirmed to play a cameo role in the film. She was reportedly playing the role of Rani Lakshmi Bai, in which the story was narrated through her perspective.

Crew 
Cinematographer Ravi Varman who was initially signed for the project, was replaced by R. Rathnavelu, after he walked out of the project due to schedule conflicts. Rajeevan was signed to do production designing. Anju Modi, Uthara Menon, Sushmitha Konidela was signed to work as costume designers. London-based stunt choreographers Greg Powell, Lee Whittaker, and Ram Lakshman choreographed the action sequences.

Filming 
Principal photography of the film kickstarted on 6 December 2017. The first schedule of the film was kickstarted on an aluminium factory located at Hyderabad, with the presence of Chiranjeevi and Brahmaji. The first schedule of the film was completed on 25 December. The second schedule of the film which was supposed to happen in January 2018, was postponed due to 20 February 2018. This schedule will be shot across Kerala, where Chiranjeevi and Nayanthara will be present. In March 2018, Nayanthara joined the sets of the film, after the shooting of her Tamil film Viswasam (2019), with Ajith Kumar, has been interrupted due to a strike. The unit has completed some action sequences under the guidance of a team of stunt choreographers from South Africa. Amitabh Bachchan joined the sets of the film in Hyderabad on 28 March 2018.

On 17 April, the shooting of the film was called off due to unknown reasons, and was resumed later on 7 June 2018. Rajeevan erected a grant village set for a war sequence, which will be shot in night effect. The team spent 35 nights to shoot the entire schedule, which was wrapped up on 27 July 2018. In August 2018, the makers shot an action sequence at the Ramoji Film City in Hyderabad. In September 2018, a crucial war sequence was filmed, which cost the makers . On late September 2018, the makers film an extensive climax sequence at Georgia, which was filmed within 25 days. A single stretch schedule was completed on 1 November to 10 December, followed by the team which went to shoot some sequences in Mysore.

In March 2019, Amitabh Bachchan rejoined the sets of the film, to complete few portions of the film, which were completed on 19 March 2019. Kiccha Sudeep, too entered the last schedule of the film on 29 March and completed late April. The makers filmed few scenes at Kerala on 19 April 2019, for a 10-day schedule which had battle sequences and several crucial scenes to be shot. After this schedule, the team returned to Hyderabad to shoot some important sequences with patchwork, which will be the last schedule in the entire shooting part.

The final schedule took place at a specially erected set in Kokapet which resembles a huge kingdom. On 2 May 2019, a major fire broke out at Chiranjeevi's farmhouse due to a short circuit. Due to which the team had halted the shooting midway. On mid-May 2019, Anushka Shetty shot her cameo sequences for the film, followed by a shoot of a special song featuring Nayanthara and Chiranjeevi in a customised set at Annapurna Studios. On 24 June 2019, the entire shooting process of the film was wrapped.

Music 

A. R. Rahman was initially approached to compose the music for the film, but in November 2017, he announced that, he will not be a part of this project, citing a busy schedule. After Rahman's refusal, composers S. Thaman (who provided music for the film's motion poster), Hiphop Tamizha and Himesh Reshammiya were reportedly in consideration. In February 2018, Ilayaraaja was rumoured to compose music for te flick, however no official announcement has been made in development. In July 2018, Amit Trivedi was hired to compose music for the film, thus making his debut in the Telugu film industry. Julius Packiam provided the background score for the film. Sirivennela Seetharama Sastry, Anantha Sriram, Chandrabose, Swanand Kirkire, Madhan Karky, Azad Varadaraj, and Siju Thuravoor wrote the lyrics for the soundtrack in Telugu, Hindi, Tamil, Kannada, and Malayalam respectively.

Lahari Music acquired the music rights for Telugu, Tamil, Malayalam and Kannada languages, whereas Hindi music rights were sold to T-Series. Prior to the soundtrack release, the first song, "O Sye Raa" was released as the film's lead single on 1 September 2019, which had vocals by Sunidhi Chauhan and Shreya Ghoshal, rendering the song in all languages. The complete soundtrack album was released in all languages (Telugu, Tamil, Hindi, Malayalam, and Kannada) on the same day, through streaming platforms, whereas it was released later in YouTube on 2 September 2019.

Track listing

Telugu

Tamil

Hindi

Malayalam

Kannada

Soundtrack reception 
Neeshita Nyayapati of The Times of India wrote that "The album of Sye Raa is underwhelming, with Amit trying too hard to match up his numbers to the grandeur of the film. What’s more disappointing is the lack of traditional Andhra elements in the film’s music, despite the story being set in the 1800s. But O Syeraa and Swaasalone Desame somehow manage to make up for the mediocrity of the other two songs." Vipin of Musicaloud on reviewing the music of the film, gave 3 out of 5 stars and stated that "Amit Trivedi’s Telugu debut is pretty much along the lines of Baahubali – majestic in an expected way and partly comes across as dependent on the elaborate visuals to bolster its appeal."

123telugu.com stated that "The album of Sye Raa is a completely situational album which takes the story ahead with its lyrics and compositions. Every song is special in itself as Amit Trivedi has given a lot of heart and soul which evoke good emotions and patriotism. This is not the regular commercial album and is the one which will impress you once you watch the lavish and beautiful visuals on screen. For now, the makers have got the music right which will surely take the narrative to another level."

Release 
Sye Raa Narasimha Reddy was initially scheduled to release in January 2019, which planned to coincide with the Sankranthi occasion. However, it was postponed to the occasion of summer, due to Ram Charan's Vinaya Vidheya Rama (2019), being released on the Sankranthi occasion. The release was further postponed due to delay in film production and the makers finalised for a Dusshera occasion (7 October 2019), although being preponed to 2 October 2019, since the release coincides with Gandhi Jayanthi and also adding the benefits of the extended holiday weekend. On 23 September 2019, the film was sent to the Central Board of Film Certification for public viewing, where it received U/A certificate from the officials.

The film was opened up on more than 4,800 screens worldwide, despite clashing with the Hindi film War (2019), and the Hollywood film Joker (2019). The film's Hindi version was distributed by Rithesh Sidhwani and Farhan Akhtar, under their Excel Entertainment banner.

Marketing 
The film's pre-release event which was supposed to be held on 18 September 2019 at Kurnool, was cancelled due to heavy rains on the location. Instead on the said date,  the makers launched the official trailer of the film. The event was later held on 22 September 2019, at the Lal Bahadur Sastri Stadium in Hyderabad, with the presence of the cast and crew and other celebritites. Another pre-release event was held on 29 September 2019 in Bangalore.

Popular Indian comic book company, Amar Chitra Katha collaborated with the film for its promotion, where a comic book based on the life of Uyyalawada Narasimha Reddy, was launched during the film's pre-release event. To promote the film, the makers headed a city tour in Bangalore, Cochin, Chennai and Mumbai. Amarapali Jewels teamed up the film, and launched a special collection of jewellery, which were used in the film. A pre release event was also held in Chennai, to promote the film’s Tamil version.

Home media 
The digital rights of the film were sold to Amazon Prime Video for  crores. The film was released on the streaming platform (simultaneously in all languages), after its theatrical run, on 21 November 2019. The satellite rights of the film were sold to Sun TV Network (for Tamil, Telugu, Malayalam and Kannada versions) and Zee TV (for the Hindi version), for a sum of  crore. The film was initially slated to air on 1 December 2019, was postponed due to unknown reasons; the dubbed Tamil version of the film was premiered on Sun TV instead, and registered a TRP rating of 15.4 with more than 11 crore impressions. The original version was premiered later on Gemini TV, in January 2020.

Reception

Critical response 

The film met with generally positive response from the viewers. Neeshita Nyayapati writing for The Times of India gave the 3.5 stars out of 5 stating that "the story-telling has its flaws, but the characters are intriguing. What's impressive is the massive canvas the film is mounted on. Sye Raa Narasimha Reddy might work only in bits and pieces, but the scenes in which the film works makes it all worthwhile!". Rahul Devulapalli writing for The Week gave the 3.5 stars out of 5 stating, "The movie's biggest strengths are its visuals, especially the war scenes. Roping in of international stunt directors has enhanced the overall experience. The producer and son of Chiranjeevi, Ram Charan, has pulled out all stops in marketing the film and it did not go waste. In the end, though the product is worth appreciating, it cannot be called a biopic of Narasimha Reddy as a lot of events in the movie are historically questionable. If you can silence the fact-checker in you, watch the movie for Chiranjeevi and the action sequences". Hemanth Kumar writing for Firstpost gave the film a 3.5 stars out of 5 statings, "At a runtime of nearly 170 minutes, Sye Raa Narasimha Reddy tells a fascinating story about a rebellion that's never been explored in Telugu cinema. Despite the familiarity of the genre, the film relies quite a lot on Chiranjeevi's screen presence. And he packs a punch and how".

Sangeetha Devi Dundoo of The Hindu praised the cinematography, costumes, Chiranjeevi's performance and adding that the makers skilfully use cinematic liberties to play to the mainstream, crowd-pleasing format.  DNA India gave the 3.5 stars out of 5 stating, "Sye Raa has enough strength to start a rebellion even today. It is a tale of how the warrior changed the future with his life and even in death". Jigar Ganatra of Mumbai Live gave the film a 3.5 out of 5 stating, "Sye Raa Narasimha Reddy Is Packed With Powerful Performances." Haricharan Pudipeddi writing for Pinkvilla gave the 3.5 out of 5 stating, "Sye Raa Narasimha Reddy definitely needed a visionary filmmaker like SS Rajamouli to make it work even more wholesomely. But, Surender Reddy still manages to impress and delivers a product that's masses-friendly. Ram Charan deserves a lot of praise for believing in this story and in his father and mounting this project on a scale that's only next to Baahubali, and there's no second thoughts about it". Shruti Rhode writing for Times Now News gave the 3 stars out of 5 stating, "The background score, crisp script and effective screenplay of Sye Raa Narasimha Reddy make for an intense, entertaining film that you definitely ought to watch. And don't be surprised if you find yourself amidst whistles, cheers, and hoots every once in a while". Janani K writing for India Today gave 3 out of 5 stating, "Sye Raa Narasimha Reddy, directed by Surender Reddy, takes the safe route in showcasing the fight to freedom. Chiranjeevi's excellent performance makes up for an underwhelming screenplay".

Apoorva Gupta writing for India TV gave 3 out of 5 stating, "Though the movie boasts of a great cast and a good story-line, it fails to make the desired impact on the audience. The screen time is too long, with the movie running for over 2 hours and 50 minutes. The story-telling feels rushed in the beginning and too-stretched in the second half. With great sets, action scenes and talented actors, Sye Raa Narasimha can make for a good one time watch!". The Hans India gave 3 out of 5 statings, "Mounted on an epic scale the movie has some breathtaking visuals, elaborate sets, life-like battle scenes, and colorful costumes. There is a lot more in the movie than just the war for freedom. There are so many wonderful scenes in the movie which will make the audience applaud. The movie is all about why Uyyalawada Narasimha Reddy went against British rule and how he had formed a group and rampaged the British etc. There are some outstanding scenes in the film which will give goosebumps to the audience. Especially the one where the British hang Narasimha Reddy will make the audience emotional. Also, the court scene is definitely amazing and the climax is handled really well. Overall, Sye Raa Narasimha Reddy is an epic story that cannot be forgotten". Krishna Sripada writing for The News Minute gave 2.5 out of 5 stating, "Surender Reddy's could-have-been magnum opus is not boring. Yet, for the budget it had, the storytelling and narrative threads leave a lot to be desired". Manoj Kumar R writing for The Indian Express gave 2.5 out of 5 stating, "The major flaw in Sye Raa Narasimha Reddy is Surender's attempt to force a sprawling story into a mould that fits the narrow definition of mainstream commercial cinema". Baradwaj Rangan of Film Companion South wrote "But even the biggest star needs the gravity of a strong screenplay, and that's where Sye Raa falters, and ultimately fails. Apart from Chiranjeevi, there is nothing holding things together — and nothing that differentiates this rise-against-the-British saga from any villager-versus-evil-landlord masala movie".

Authenticity 
Historians across India have noted that the concept of Indian nationalism was not yet developed at the time. Instead, the rebellion was his struggle to keep his rights and privileges that the East India Company were trying to confiscate from him. Nekkanti Srinivasa Rao, a Telugu historian, told to media that the movie lacks historical accuracy, saying that Narasimha Reddy only questioned the British authorities for his monthly pension which he was supposed to inherit from his grandfather.

Telugu writer SDV Aziz who penned the popular biography of Narasimha Reddy Renati Surya Chandrulu was of the opinion that some cinematic liberty is necessary because of the emotional charge it needs to provide to the viewer. However, director Surender Reddy has made it clear to the Telangana High court that Sye Raa is not a biopic but is inspired by his life. The film was released with a disclaimer through which the makers emphasize that while the story is inspired by the life of Uyyalawada Narasimha Reddy, they do not claim historical accuracy for all the events shown in the narrative.

Box office

India 
The film opened in more than 3,000 screens across India, with 1,270 screens in Andhra Pradesh and Telangana. The film received six shows, including a special midnight premiere on the day of its release. At the day of its release, the film earned  worldwide, becoming the fifth biggest opener in South India. The film performed extremely well at the Chennai box office, with Tamil and Telugu version of the film collectively has raked in Rs 32 lakh. The Hindi version of the film, raked in Rs. 3.10 crore, despite clashing with the Hindi film War (2019), and the dubbed Indian version of Hollywood film Joker (2019).

The film faced a significant drop at the box office, due to mixed word-of-mouth, and the decline in the film's collections, in Tamil Nadu, Kerala and North Indian markets.

Overseas 
The movie opened in the United States on 1 October 2019 and it collected around $750,000. and in Australia it collected at A$162,000. At the US, the film crossed the $1 million mark, in the first day of its release. At Uk, the film collected 29,442 pounds during its premiere.

Accolades

Notes

References

External links 

SyeRaaNarasimhaReddy on Facebook

2010s historical action films
2010s Telugu-language films
2019 films
Cultural depictions of Indian monarchs
Cultural depictions of Rani Laxmibai
Films directed by Surender Reddy
Films shot at Ramoji Film City
Indian epic films
Indian historical action films
Films set in the 1850s
Films set in the British Raj
Films about the Indian Rebellion of 1857
Films set in Kurnool
Films shot in Hyderabad, India
Films shot in Kerala